Stephanie McKay is an American soul singer and songwriter from the Bronx in New York, whose music includes elements of soul, funk, rock and hip hop. McKay's career has spanned over 20 years, during which time she has collaborated with artists including Anthony Hamilton, DJ Spinna Toshi Reagon and Big lovely, Roy Hargrove, Jacques Schwarz-Bart, Katalyst, Mos Def, Talib Kweli, Tricky, Carl Hancock Rux and Amp Fiddler and numerous others. She has released two solo albums, McKay (2003) and Tell it Like it Is (2008), a self-titled EP Stephanie McKay (2006) and has toured internationally as a solo artist. She formerly played guitar in Kelis' band and recorded with the Brooklyn Funk Essentials.

Early life
Stephanie McKay was born in New York City and raised in the Bronx. During her early years, she was a member of school choirs and music groups at Truman High School, before joining the Alvin Ailey School. McKay then moved onto the University of the Arts in Philadelphia where she graduated with a BFA in modern dance in 1993.

Early music career
After a knee injury detoured her dance aspirations, McKay started to audition for singing jobs. One of those auditions was for producer Kashif who hired her on the spot for a new girl group called "The Promise".  The group went on to be signed by Clive Davis at Arista Records. It was during this period that McKay began writing songs.  She also began to study singing under Don Lawrence and drums under Kenwood Dennard.

Solo career
While pursuing her professional music aspirations in New York, McKay continued to dance with several modern dance companies, including Jane Comfort, Amy Pivar, Urban Bush woman, as well as sing her original music in New York City clubs.  She also began to gain more work as a session vocalist for various artists, including Carl Hancock Rux. While on tour with Kelis in England, Stephanie met Geoff Barrow through Rux.

First Album: McKay 
McKay and Barrow collaborated on the album McKay, which included original compositions by Stephanie, along with producers Tim Saul and Geoff Barrow. Barrow is credited in the album's sleeve notes as "Fuzzface".  The album also features two songs co-penned by Barrow and Rux and additional instrumentation by other notable, Bristol-based musicians in Adrian Utley and John Baggott.  The LP also contains the closing track "Echo", a Sweet Honey in the Rock cover version, penned by the acclaimed social activist, Bernice Johnson Reagon.

The album received critical acclaim, with The Guardian saying it was "resurrecting the passion and pride of politically conscious and eternally lovelorn ladies of late-1960s, early 1970s soul, McKay shines bright." MOJO described McKay as "extraordinarily eclectic" and her album as "a coherent artistic statement" and "worth investigating."

McKay went on to play at the WOMAD, Bristol and the Jazz Cafe in England and her music received international acclaim and rotation on MTV. The album McKay was released in Europe on (Go Beat/Polydor/Universal). Stephanie was soon signed by American company Astralwerks .
In an attempt to introduce McKay to the American market, the label released a five song EP in September 2006 with two new songs from forthcoming album, two older songs from McKay, and a remix by DJ Spinna of  "Tell It Like It Is", as well as being featured on US funk musician Amp Fiddler's album release Afro Strut.

Second Album: Tell It Like It Is 
McKay's second album Tell It Like It Is was later released independently on Pias/Muthas of Invention. McKay went on to play at the Glastonbury Festival in 2009, North Sea Jazz Festival, and Spoleto in France.

Additional Works 
After the death of her mom in 2008 and the birth of her son in 2009, Mckay took a hiatus and concentrated on motherhood instead of touring. She continued to release singles with longtime collaborator DJ Katalyst from Australia with the single "Day into Night" and "You can't save me".

In January 2013, she sang with Jimmy Cliff on The Super Bowl 2013 Volkswagen commercial "Get Happy".

Collaboration with Jacques Schwarz-Bart 
She is married to jazz tenor saxophonist Jacques Schwarz-Bart. The couple have collaborated musically with the album Rise above (Dreyfus) an album released by her husband which contained the single "Feel so free". The album's song " Forget regret" has been covered by Roy Hargrove. "Friend and lover" a composition McKay and Schwarz-Bart wrote together for jazz guitarist Yosuke Onuma (Sony) Japan was also recorded by EMILY (jazz pianist and singer) and TOKU (trumpeter and singer) for Sony.

Music 
McKay's musical style has been described as "Motown meets midnight Marauder". Her songs fuse powerful urban poetics with sonic sound waves that includes elements of hip-hop, rock, pop, soul.
McKay says her music is influenced by her childhood in New York and the classic soul singers of the sixties and inventiveness of popular soul bands from the seventies. "I have a brother who is eight years older than me, who was always playing 70's soul and funk music like Earth, Wind And Fire and the Ohio Players, while my mom was in the other room listening to Al Green and Barry White.  On my own though, I was a fan of the classic pop station WABC, where I first discovered artists like Michael Jackson and Jim Croce."

Albums
McKay (2003)
Stephanie McKay EP (2006)
Tell It Like It Is (2008)

Singles/EPs
Tell him
Take me Over
Tell it like it is
Stephanie McKay EP (2006)
Jackson Avenue (2008)
Song in my Heart (2018)
Phenonmenon (2022)

References

External links
 
 https://www.facebook.com/stephaniemckaymusic
 https://www.twitter.com/stephaniemckay
 https://soundcloud.com/stephanie-mckay
 MySpace page

African-American women singer-songwriters
American rhythm and blues singer-songwriters
American neo soul singers
Singers from New York City
Actresses from New York City
Living people
Year of birth missing (living people)
American film actresses
African-American actresses
Entertainers from the Bronx
Brooklyn Funk Essentials members
21st-century African-American women singers
Singer-songwriters from New York (state)
Musicians from the Bronx